Patty Markley (born March 27, 1969) is an American politician who served in the Kansas House of Representatives from the 8th district from 2017 to 2019.

On August 7, 2018, she was defeated in the Republican primary for the 8th district.

References

1969 births
Living people
Republican Party members of the Kansas House of Representatives
21st-century American politicians